Municipal Relaxation Module is a Canadian short comedy-drama film, directed by Matthew Rankin and released in 2022. The film stars Maurice Krank as Ken, a man in Winnipeg who has an idea to improve a park bench but gets lost in the maze of city bureaucracy when he tries to suggest it, becoming increasingly frustrated until his only choice left for calming down is to sit on the very park bench he was trying to change.

The film premiered at the 2022 Toronto International Film Festival.

It was named to TIFF's annual year-end Canada's Top Ten list for 2022.

Awards
The film was the winner of the Prix SPIRA at the 2022 Abitibi-Témiscamingue International Film Festival.

References

External links

2022 films
2022 short films
2022 comedy-drama films
Canadian comedy short films
Canadian drama short films
Films directed by Matthew Rankin
2020s English-language films
2020s Canadian films
Films set in Winnipeg
Films shot in Winnipeg